The Fairchild F-46, also known as the Duramold Aircraft Corporation F-46 A, is a light aircraft that was built using the Duramold process, later used on the Spruce Goose.

Design
The Model 46 is a low-wing, cabin aircraft, with conventional landing gear and structures made using Duramold processes. The fuselage is constructed of two halves bonded together. The wings use wooden spars with plywood covering. The control surfaces use aluminum frames with aircraft fabric covering. A  fuel tank was mounted in each wing.

Operational history
In 1947 the Model 46 prototype was re-engined with a Pratt & Whitney R-985 and flown for ten years.

Specifications (Fairchild 46)

See also

References

1930s United States civil utility aircraft
Single-engined tractor aircraft
Low-wing aircraft
Aircraft first flown in 1937